Yamaha XSR900 is a neo-retro standard Universal Japanese Motorcycle (UJM), which uses an  transverse inline-triple engine. Introduced in 2016, the XSR900 is derived from Yamaha's MT-09 (known as FZ-09 in North America).

Background 
Yamaha brought the XSR900 to market in 2016, releasing it in two variants worldwide.

The first, a variant uses a yellow and black paint scheme with a gold-colored inverted fork. This paint scheme is a 60th Anniversary Edition first used on other Yamaha models in 2015, such as the YZF-R1, to commemorate Yamaha's 60 years of racing heritage, which began in 1955. and strongly resembles the classic "speed block" design popularized by Kenny Roberts in the 1970s.  The second variant uses a more muted aluminum tank over black frame and black inverted fork.  (See Photo)

The Yamaha XSR900 and MT-09 share the same 847 cc liquid-cooled DOHC inline three-cylinder engine with a 120° crankshaft. The engine has a power output of  @ 10,000 rpm and  @ 8,500 rpm. The XSR incorporated several new features, including user-changeable throttle control mappings, a new engine control unit, antilock braking system, multiple traction control modes, and stiffened suspension.

Model updates 

Little changed from the 2016 model; the 2017 XSR900 featured updated tires (the s20 Bridgestone Battlax tires on the 2016 model were discontinued), and revised paint schemes varied according to the market: 
In the USA - Titanium Blue 
In Canada - Blue and Black 
In the UK - Garage Metal, Rock Slate, and Midnight Black

In November 2016, Yamaha announced the 2017 XSR900 Abarth, a limited-edition "Sport Heritage café racer special". Yamaha collaborated with Abarth, an Italian brand from the car-racing world. The Abarth's specification comprises a carbon-fibre nose cowl and a rear seat cowling, handlebars that are low-slung 'clip-on style', rear-sets, traction control, a slipper clutch, and an Akrapovic titanium exhaust. Production of the XSR900 Abarth is to be only 695 units, and each bike is to have a numbered aluminium "authenticity plaque". Yamaha's novel marketing strategy to promote the Abarth prohibited intending buyers from placing an advance order; instead, those who wished to be one of the first 95 to own an Abarth had to make an online bid at 13.00 hr on January 17, 2017.  The remaining 600 bikes were to be sold conventionally through dealers.

The 2018 models and onwards support the OEM QuickShifter from Yamaha (OEM Part number BS2-E81A0-V0-00), earlier models need a third-party QS. The support for QS can be checked by turning on the ignition, and a QS indicator should be flashing by in the instrument cluster beside the gear indicator.

Awards 

On its release, the 2016 XSR900 received journalistic praise, and it gained several awards, including Cycle World's 2016 Best Middleweight Street Bike and G-Mark's 2016 Good Design Award.

References

External links 
 Official Website

Sport bikes
XSR900
Motorcycles introduced in 2016